Scouts Aotearoa, known internationally as Scouts Aotearoa New Zealand is a trading name of The Scout Association of New Zealand, the national Scouting association in New Zealand and an affiliate of the World Organization of the Scout Movement (WOSM) since 1953. Scouts Aotearoa had 12,156 youth members and with 5,888 volunteers as of the end of 2020.

The association actively participates in many Asia-Pacific Region and World Scout camps and Jamborees.

History
For the history of Scouting in New Zealand generally, from 1908 see Scouting in New Zealand.

In 1923, The Boy Scouts Association of the United Kingdom formed a branch in New Zealand and set about re-organising scouting according to its Policy, Organisation and Rules and establishing its Wolf Cubs and Rover programs. The Boy Scouts Association's New Zealand branch was incorporated in 1941 as The Boy Scouts Association (New Zealand Branch), Incorporated which changed its name to The Boy Scouts Association of New Zealand in 1956 and then to The Scout Association of New Zealand in 1967.

Until 1953 the New Zealand branch was represented internationally through The Boy Scouts Association of the United Kingdom. In 1953, the New Zealand branch became a direct member of the World Organization of the Scout Movement.

In 1963, the Venturer Scout section was introduced.

In 1976, the first females became members of the Venturer section, on a trial basis. In 1979, females were formally admitted and the Venturer section became co-ed. In 1987, girls were formally admitted into the Scout section. This was followed by girls being admitted into the Kea and Cub programs in 1989.

In 1979, Mr. Arthur W.V. Reeve was awarded the Bronze Wolf, the only distinction of the World Organization of the Scout Movement, awarded by the World Scout Committee for exceptional services to world Scouting.

Scout Law 
The Scout Law was rewritten, and reduced to three key tenets in 2015:Have Respect

 For yourself and others
 For the environment

Do What is Right

 Be trustworthy and tolerant
 Have integrity

Be Positive

 Accept challenges with courage
 Be a friend to allAn official Maori language translation was also created:He whai whakaaro

 Ki a koe, ki tangata kē atu
 Ki te taiao

Kia tika

 Kia manawanui  
 Kia ngākau pono.

Kia ngākau pai

 Tū whitia te hopo
 Hei hoa ki te katoa

Scout Promise 
On 24 July 2017, the Scout Promise and Kea Promise changed to a new version:On my honour, I promise to do my best,

To develop my spiritual beliefs,

To contribute to my community, country and world,

To help other people,

And to live by the Scout Law.This Promise is now used by all members except youth members in the Kea section. The previous Kea Motto became the new Kea Promise:I share, I care, I discover, I grow.

Sections
According to the current Scouts New Zealand website (2018):
 Keas - ages 5–8
 Cubs - ages 8–11
 Scouts - ages 11–14
 Venturers - ages 14–18
 Rovers - ages 18 to 26 (membership as an Associate Rover 26 - 28)
Kaiārahi (previously titled Leader) - ages 18+
 Associates - ages 18+

All section programmes are coeducational (mixed gender). Scouts Aotearoa has similar programme sections as The Scout Association in the United Kingdom, although the names are slightly different: Beavers are called Keas, Venturers in place of Explorers, and Rovers in place of the Scout Network.

Scout groups focus on a variety of activities focusing on the Personal, Adventure and Community programme areas.  In addition to regular Land Scout Groups, some groups specialise as Air Scouts and Sea Scouts, offering either specialised aviation or water activities.

Events

Jamboree

The first New Zealand Jamboree, the New Zealand Exhibition Jamboree was held in Dunedin in the years 1925–6. An estimated 200 people attended. The next was held in Auckland in 1958–9. Since then they have been held every three years. The 20th New Zealand Jamboree was held from 2013 to 2014 in Feilding, and the 21st New Zealand Jamboree was held at Renwick Sports Ground, Marlborough, from 29 December 2016 to 7 January 2017.

Venture
There have been 15 National Ventures in New Zealand. The first New Zealand venture was held in Hastings. The 11th New Zealand Venture was held at Brookfield near Wellington from 1 to 11 January 2010, with Venture South 2013 being held at Riverton, Southland from 5 to 14 January 2013. The 13th National Venture (Inferno 2016) was held in and around Rotorua in January, 2016. The 15th National Venture (Ignite 23) was held from 29 December 2022 to 8th January 2023, at Mayfield in South Canterbury.

Venture is held for Venturers approximately three years.

Moot

As of 2021, there have been 79 National Rover Moots in New Zealand. Moots are normally held locally and nationally once a year which are organised and run by Rovers. The 79th National Rover Moot (Déjà Vu Moot) was held at Aka Aka Primary school, Waiuku, Auckland over Easter weekend 2021.

Scouts Aotearoa elsewhere
Non-sovereign territories with Scouting run by Scouts Aotearoa include
 Cook Islands - Cook Islands Boy Scout Association
 Niue - Scouting in Niue
 Tokelau - Scouting in Tokelau

See also
 Scouting in New Zealand
 Sea Scouts New Zealand
 Air Scout
 GirlGuiding New Zealand

References

External links
 

World Organization of the Scout Movement member organizations
Scouting and Guiding in New Zealand
Youth organizations established in 1923
1923 establishments in New Zealand